Shingo can refer to:

Religion
Shingon Buddhism

Locations
Shingō, Okayama (神郷町), a town located in Atetsu District, Okayama Prefecture, Japan
Shingō, Aomori (新郷村), a village located in Sannohe District, Aomori Prefecture, Japan which claims to be the final resting place of Jesus Christ

People
Shingo (given name)